Adrian Emmanuel Forbes (born 23 January 1979) is an English former professional footballer and Head of Coaching & Player Development  at Luton Town.

As a player, he was a midfielder and forward from 1996 until 2012. Having started his career with Norwich City in 1996 he remained with the club for six years establishing himself in the Canaries' first team before moving to Luton Town in 2001. He went on to play for Swansea City, Blackpool, Millwall and Grimsby Town. Having been relegated out of the Football League with Grimsby in 2010, he was released by the club; he subsequently dropped into non-league, joining Lowestoft Town, where he remained for two seasons before retiring from competitive football in May 2012.

Forbes scored the last league goal for Swansea City at the Vetch Field against Shrewsbury Town on 30 April 2005 in a 1–0 win in front of 11,469 past a young Joe Hart . He then went on to score the winning goal against Bury to secure promotion to League 1 with a volley after 15 seconds in front of 6000 travelling Swansea fans.

Career

Norwich City
Forbes began his career at Norwich City in 1995. He played under several different managers in his six years at Carrow Road, including Martin O'Neill, Mike Walker and Bruce Rioch. Forbes remained with City from 1996 to 2001, he played in 131 league games, scoring 8 goals.

Luton Town
In the summer of 2001 he moved to Luton Town in a £60,000 deal, and played in three seasons at Kenilworth Road, notably playing his best football under Mike Newell.

Swansea City
Forbes signed for Swansea City, who were then in Football League Two, on a free transfer in 2004. In his first season at the club he was ever-present and scored seven goals. On 30 April 2005, Forbes scored Swansea's last-ever league goal at their Vetch Field stadium in a 1–0 win over Shrewsbury Town, before their move to the Liberty Stadium. The following match he scored again against Bury to earn the club automatic promotion to Football League One. Two years later, in May 2006, he was released by Swansea. Forbes claimed that there had been on-going discussions about a new contract and that he had expected to stay at the club. He reacted by saying he was "shocked and hurt" and that he left "with a very bitter taste" in his mouth about the way the club treated him.

Blackpool
On 1 July he signed for Blackpool on a two-year contract with an option for a further year. In December 2006, before Blackpool played Swansea at Bloomfield Road, Forbes publicly slated Swansea manager Kenny Jackett for the manner in which he was released from the club earlier that year, stating that he was still bitter at Jackett. He scored his first goal for Blackpool on 6 March 2007, in a 2–0 win over AFC Bournemouth at Bloomfield Road. He played in Blackpool's Play-off final win over Yeovil Town at Wembley Stadium which earned the club promotion to the Football League Championship for the first time since 1978.

Millwall
On 3 January 2008, after failing to establish himself in Blackpool's Championship side, Forbes signed an 18-month contract with Football League One club Millwall despite recently being managed by Kenny Jackett who released him at Swansea City over a year earlier. Forbes however only played 13 times for the club and struggled to establish himself as a first team player.

Grimsby Town
Forbes signed for Grimsby Town, managed by Mike Newell, on 2 February 2009, signing on loan until the end of the 2008–2009 season. In his second game he scored an overhead kick to equalise in the 3–3 draw with Barnet. On 6 July 2009 following his release from Millwall, Forbes agreed to join Grimsby permanently on a two-year deal. During the 09/10 season, Forbes struggled to break into the first team and was eventually ruled out for a lengthy period after breaking his leg. This coupled with playing second fiddle to other players and the failure to consistently earn a place in the team meant that he would only feature in 13 league matches throughout the entire season. Forbes had returned to fitness towards the end of the campaign but only made a cameo appearance as the season wound to a close. On 12 May 2010, Forbes was one of seven players placed who were deemed surplus to requirements and were placed on the transfer list by Grimsby manager Neil Woods following their relegation from the Football League. After failing to find a new club, Forbes was handed a squad number for the 2010–2011 season along with Nick Colgan, Nick Hegarty and Chris Jones who has also failed to sign terms elsewhere. On 13 July it was announced that Grimsby had accepted a request to let Forbes join league rivals Darlington for 3 days of training with a view to a permanent move. Darlington had also requested to use Forbes in a friendly in which Grimsby boss Neil Woods declined. Forbes had his contract at Grimsby cancelled by mutual consent on 1 September 2010.

Lowestoft Town
On 16 September 2010, Forbes joined Conference National side Hayes & Yeading on trial.
On 30 September 2010 Forbes joined Lowestoft Town, signing a two-year deal. In May 2012 following the conclusion of the 2011–12 season Forbes announced his departure from Lowestoft and his retirement from competitive football.

Coaching career
In October 2011 Forbes re-joined Norwich City as an academy coach on a part-time basis alongside his playing days with Lowestoft, however following his retirement in May 2012 Forbes became a full-time coach with City. After gaining a full-time role at Norwich's Cat 1 academy looking after the U9 and U10 players he was promoted in September 2017 and he is currently the Lead Foundation Phase Coach and responsible for the day-to-day running of the U9 to U12 age groups as well as being the match day announcer at Carrow Road. He is also in year 4 of The Premier Leagues Elite Coaches Apprenticeship Scheme.

He now works as the Head of Coaching & Player Development  at Luton Town.

Career statistics

Honours

Swansea City
 Football League Trophy: 2005–06

Blackpool
 League One play-off final winner: 2007

References

External links

Career information at ex-canaries.co.uk
England profile at TheFA

1979 births
Living people
People from Ealing
English footballers
Norwich City F.C. players
Luton Town F.C. players
Swansea City A.F.C. players
Blackpool F.C. players
Millwall F.C. players
Grimsby Town F.C. players
Lowestoft Town F.C. players
English Football League players
Association football midfielders
Luton Town F.C. non-playing staff